Mikhail Nikolayevich Bagayev (born 28 February 1985) is a Russian professional football player.

Club career
He played for the main squads of FC Moscow and FC Rubin Kazan in the Russian Cup.

He made his Russian Premier League debut for PFC Spartak Nalchik on 12 March 2011 in a game against PFC Krylia Sovetov Samara.

He played in the 2017–18 Russian Cup final for FC Avangard Kursk on 9 May 2018 in the Volgograd Arena against 2-1 winners FC Tosno.

References

External links
 

1985 births
Living people
People from Kirov, Kirov Oblast
Russian footballers
Russian Premier League players
FC Dynamo Kirov players
FC Moscow players
FC Rubin Kazan players
FC Krasnodar players
PFC Spartak Nalchik players
FC SKA-Khabarovsk players
FC Torpedo Moscow players
FC Tyumen players
FC Fakel Voronezh players
FC Izhevsk players
Association football midfielders
FC Avangard Kursk players
FC Znamya Truda Orekhovo-Zuyevo players